Pholcus fragillimus, is a species of spider of the genus Pholcus. It is distributed from Sri Lanka, India to Japan. The type material of Pholcus fragillimus has probably been destroyed in Stuttgart during the Second World War, and only one female is available now in museums.

See also
 List of Pholcidae species

References

Pholcidae
Spiders of Asia
Spiders described in 1907